Zeynabad (also Romanized as Zeynābād; also known as Zīnatābād) is a village in Paskhan Rural District, in the Central District of Darab County, Fars Province, Iran. At the 2006 census, its population was 340, with 80 families.

References 

Populated places in Darab County